is a city in Nagasaki Prefecture, Japan. It occupies the southern tip of Shimabara Peninsula. , the city has an estimated population of 45,465 and a population density of 270 persons per km2. The total area is 169.89 km2.

The modern city of Minamishimabara was founded on March 31, 2006, from the merger of the towns of Arie, Fukae, Futsu, Kazusa, Kitaarima, Kuchinotsu, Minamiarima and Nishiarie (all from Minamitakaki District). Minamitakaki District was dissolved as a result of this merger.

History
The area now comprising Minamishimabara was under the control of the Arima clan, who ruled from Hinoe Castle in the Muromachi period. The area was the site of considerable foreign trade and Portuguese and Spanish missionary activity, and by the early Edo period, a large percentage of the population were Kirishitan. After the start of the national isolation policy, the Tokugawa Bakufu banned Christianity from 1614 and replaced Arima Naozumi with Matsukura Shigemasa, who relocated the capital of Shimabara Domain to Shimabara Castle is what is now Shimabara. Due to misgovernment, high taxes and persecution of Christianity, the population rose in the Shimabara Rebellion of 1637, with the peasants occupying the fortress of Hara Castle as their strongpoint. The rebellion was suppressed with extreme severity by the Tokugawa Bakufu, and the area of Minamishimabara was ruled by a branch of the Matsudaira clan from 1668 to 1774 and from 1774 to 1871.

Geography

Climate
Minamishimabara has a humid subtropical climate (Köppen:Cfa) with hot summers and cool winters.

Demographics
Per Japanese census data, the population of Minamishimabara in 2020 is 42,330 people. Minamishimabara has been conducting censuses since 1920. Minamishimabara's population peaked in 1945 and has since declined; the city's population in 2020 is only 50% of its 1945 population.

References

External links

  
 

Cities in Nagasaki Prefecture